Megyn Samantha Price (born March 24, 1971) is an American actress, best known for her roles on television as Claudia Finnerty in the Fox/WB sitcom Grounded for Life (2001–05), Audrey Bingham on the CBS sitcom Rules of Engagement (2007–13), and Mary Roth on the Netflix sitcom The Ranch (2016–2020). Also in 2020, she had a small role as Eline Harris The Resident.

Early life
Price was born in Seattle, Washington, and was raised as a Mormon. While attending Norman High School in Norman, Oklahoma, she produced and wrote a play, Here Comes the Sun, but thought acting was "the dumbest career choice anyone could possibly make". At Stanford University she studied economics and communication, and continued to act in school productions, as well as performing at American Conservatory Theater in San Francisco. After a year as an investment banker, Price decided to pursue acting as a profession.

Career
Price began her acting career in the early 1990s. She made her television debut in an episode of Quantum Leap. She has also made a number of guest appearances on television shows, including Saved by the Bell: The New Class, Renegade, The Drew Carey Show, Will & Grace, and Drop Dead Diva. Her first series regular role was in the short-lived 1996 ABC comedy series Common Law opposite Greg Giraldo. From 1998 to 1999, she was lead actress in another short-lived sitcom, called LateLine, on NBC. In film, she had supporting roles in Mystery, Alaska and Larry the Cable Guy: Health Inspector.

From 2001 to 2005, Price starred as Claudia Finnerty in The WB comedy series Grounded for Life opposite Donal Logue. She later starred as Audrey Bingham in the CBS sitcom  Rules of Engagement alongside Patrick Warburton and David Spade. She also directed one episode of season seven. The series was cancelled after seven seasons and 100 episodes in May 2013. Later in 2013, Price starred in the Lifetime television movie, A Country Christmas Story, and was cast in the Lifetime comedy-drama pilot UnREAL as an executive producer named Julia, opposite Shiri Appleby. On February 6, 2014, Lifetime officially green-lit UnREAL with a 10-episode series order, set to premiere in the summer of 2014. On June 2, 2014, Constance Zimmer replaced Price in the show. In early 2016, Price returned to television with a role in the Netflix comedy series, The Ranch along with Ashton Kutcher and Elisha Cuthbert, playing Danny Masterson's love interest. In 2020, she Guest Starred in Episode 4 of Season 10 of Curb Your Enthusiasm.

Personal life
Price lives in Montecito, California, with her second husband Edward Cotner, an emergency department doctor and a former high school friend. They have a daughter. Her first husband was Bill Lawrence, the creator of Scrubs and other television shows.

Filmography

References

External links
 
 

1971 births
20th-century American actresses
21st-century American actresses
Actresses from Seattle
American film actresses
American Latter Day Saints
American television actresses
American voice actresses
Living people
Stanford University alumni